Sabine Dittmar (born 15 September 1964) is a German physician and politician of the Social Democratic Party (SPD) from the state of Bavaria who has been serving as a member of the Bundestag since 2013. In 2021 she became Parliamentary State Secretary at the German Ministry of Health.

Medical career 
From 1995 until 2010, Dittmar and her husband operated a private practice in Maßbach. Shortly after the outbreak of the COVID-19 pandemic in Germany, Dittmar volunteered at a testing station in her constituency.

Political career

Career in state politics 
From 2008 until 2013, Dittmar served as a member of the State Parliament of Bavaria, where she was her parliamentary group's spokesperson for consumer protection.

Member of the German Parliament, 2013–present 
Dittmar became a member of the Bundestag in the 2013 German federal election, representing the Bad Kissingen district. She is a member of the Committee on Health and the Committee on Tourism. In this capacity, she was her parliamentary group's rapporteur on public health insurance and pharmacies. Since 2018, she has been serving as her group's spokesperson on health policy. 

Within her parliamentary group, Dittmar has been part of working groups on the consequences of the COVID-19 pandemic in Germany (since 2021) and health (since 2014).

Other activities 
 Gegen Vergessen – Für Demokratie, Member 
 German Red Cross (DRK), Member

References

External links 

  
 Bundestag biography 

1964 births
Living people
Members of the Bundestag for Bavaria
Female members of the Bundestag
21st-century German women politicians
Members of the Bundestag 2021–2025
Members of the Bundestag 2017–2021
Members of the Bundestag 2013–2017
Members of the Bundestag for the Social Democratic Party of Germany
People from Schweinfurt
German general practitioners